Cojoba arborea (common names include algarrobo, ardillo, lorito, barba de jolote, iguano, quebracho, sang sang, tamarindo, tambrán, tuburús, and bahamas sibicú) is a leguminous tree of the family Fabaceae found in the Caribbean, Mexico, and Central America, southward to Ecuador in South America at elevations of . The tree is not common in naturalized forests, but it can be found in open sites and transition zones.

Description
The flowering period is from April to June.

Wood
The cambium is clear and the cortex is a clear-brown color. The wood is heavy but easy to work. The grains are regular but tend to crack when the wood is dry. The lumber is dimensionally stable when dry. It is resistant to attack by insects and very durable.  The lumber is used for heavy construction, stakes and posts, fine carpentry, flooring, stairways, plywood sheets, paper manufacture, cabinetry and other applications. The price of the wood is stable and has a tendency to increase in value.  The wood is exported to the United States under the name of bahamas sibucú.

Silviculture
The seeds are not viable long after pod maturity, with 80% viability after 10 days of storage and 0% viability after 25 days of storage. If the seeds are fresh, 90% of them germinate in soil containing 30% organic matter.  Viable seeds germinate 22 days after planting. They tend to tolerate a wide range of pH conditions, from 4.8 to 8.0. Trees can be planted at 5–8 months after seed germination when the roots have extended to the bottom of the growing bags. Plantations need to be started during the rainy season.

References

Quesada, J.F., Jiménez, Q., Zamora, N., Aguila, R., Gonzalez, J. 1997. Arboles de la Península de Osa. INBio, Heredia, Costa Rica.
PROECEN. snt. Barba de Jolote Cojoba arborea (L.) Brithand Rose. Colección de Maderas Tropicales de Honduras, Ficha Técnica No. 5, 4 pp.

Mimosoids
Trees of Mexico
Trees of South America